The Mitchell River is a  river in Chatham, Massachusetts on Cape Cod. It is an estuary connecting Mill Pond to Stage Harbor.

References

Rivers of Barnstable County, Massachusetts
Estuaries of Massachusetts
Rivers of Massachusetts
Estuaries of Barnstable County, Massachusetts